The 25th Waffen Grenadier Division of the SS "Hunyadi" (1st Hungarian) was a short-lived infantry division of the Waffen-SS, an armed branch of the German Nazi Party that served alongside but was never formally part of the Wehrmacht during World War II. Established in November 1944 following the German overthrow of the Hungarian regime of Miklós Horthy, it consisted mainly of troops drawn from the Royal Hungarian Army's 13th Honvéd Division. It was never properly formed, trained, or equipped, and after being evacuated from its training camp in the face of the advancing Soviet Red Army, it surrendered to the United States Army in Austria in May 1945.

History
The division was initially designated 25. SS-Freiwilligen Grenadier Division by the Germans, but was later redesignated 25. Waffen-Grenadier-Division der SS "Hunyadi" (ungarische Nr. 1). The title Hunyadi commemorated the 15th century Hungarian general John Hunyadi. Established in November 1944 following the German overthrow of the Hungarian regime of Miklós Horthy, it consisted of troops drawn from the Royal Hungarian Army's 13th Honvéd Division, as well as a ski battalion. By January 1945, the 20,000 troops available for the formation of the division were concentrated at the German training camp at Neuhammer, but there were few weapons and vehicles to equip the fledgling division, and supplies were also scarce. In February 1945, the Soviet Red Army was closing on the division's training area, so the troops were evacuated, reaching Austria in April. A kampfgruppe left behind as a  rearguard at Neuhammer was destroyed. The remainder of the division was involved in its first significant combat on 3 May, fighting elements of the U.S. Third Army. It surrendered to the Americans near the Attersee over the following two days.

Commanders
The division was commanded by two officers:
SS-Oberführer Thomas Müller (November 1944)
Waffen-Gruppenführer József Grassy (November 1944 – May 1945)

Order of Battle (1944–1945)
The division consisted of the following principal units:
61st Waffen-SS Infantry Regiment 
2 Battalions
62nd Waffen-SS Infantry Regiment 
2 battalions
63rd Waffen-SS Infantry Regiment 
2 battalions
25th Waffen-SS Artillery Regiment 
4 battalions
25th Waffen-SS Ski Battalion 
25th Waffen-SS Bicycle Battalion
25th Waffen-SS Combat Engineer Battalion 
25th Waffen-SS Anti-Tank Battalion
25th Waffen-SS Anti-Aircraft Battalion
25th Waffen-SS Signal Battalion
25th Waffen-SS Divisional Interpreter Company
25th Waffen-SS Divisional Supply Regiment 
25th Waffen-SS Training and Replacement Regiment 
86th Hungarian Replacement and Training Regiment
4 battalions

Insignia
A right hand collar patch bearing the capital letter "H" was manufactured and was worn by some members of the division, but it is likely that many of the troops wore blank collar patches or the standard sig runes. An armshield in the Hungarian national colours was planned, but it is unclear if any were made or worn.

See also
 List of Waffen-SS units
 Table of ranks and insignia of the Waffen-SS
 Waffen-SS foreign volunteers and conscripts

References

Footnotes

Bibliography

 
 
 

25
Military units and formations of Hungary in World War II
Foreign volunteer units of the Waffen-SS
Infantry divisions of the Waffen-SS
Military units and formations established in 1944
Military units and formations disestablished in 1945
Germany–Hungary relations